Phir Se is a 2018 Indian romance film, directed by Kunal Kohli and Ajay Bhuyan. Initially slated for 2015 release, the film released after 3 years on video streaming platform Netflix in 2018. The web film stars Kunal Kohli, Jennifer Winget and Sumona Chakravarti. Rajit Kapoor, Dalip Tahil, Kanwaljeet Singh and Sushmita Mukherjee are in supporting roles. This is the first web film of director Kunal Kohli as an actor and the debut web film of Jennifer Winget. The tagline of the film is "I'm not 40—I'm 18 with 22 years  experience." The trailer was released on 7 April 2015.

Plot 
The film presents a separated couple living in London, trying to come to terms with the consequences of their split.

Cast 
 Kunal Kohli as Jai Khanna
 Jennifer Winget as Kajal Kapoor
 Rajit Kapoor as Krish
 Sumona Chakravarti as Pia
 Dalip Tahil as Mikey
 Kanwaljeet Singh as Mr. Chadda
 Sushmita Mukherjee as Mummy Ji
 Atul Sharma as London Airport Commuter
 George Morris as The Wedding Planner
 Manmeet Singh as Judge
 Monisha Hassen as Lady in the Women's room
 Akash Pillay as Raj

Production

Filming
The film was shot in Amritsar and London.

Soundtrack 

The soundtrack was composed by Jeet Gannguli and lyrics were by Rashmi Virag. Singers include Shreya Ghoshal, Tulsi Kumar, Mohit Chauhan, Arijit Singh, Monali Thakur and Nikhil D'Souza. Shreya Ghoshal gave voice to 5 tracks of the album. The first song of the film is "Maine Socha Ki Chura Loon" released on 23 January 2018. The song "Rozana" was gifted to Kunal Kohli by T-Series manager Bhushan Kumar.

Marketing 
Kunal Kohli tweeted the theatrical poster of his film on 13 October 2014. It was first time any information about the film was revealed. The first look of the film was also revealed then.

The trailer was released through the movie's official Facebook and Twitter accounts and the T-Series YouTube channel on 7 April 2015. Celebrities including Karan Johar, Rishi Kapoor, Gautam Singhania, Farhan Akhtar, Priyanka Chopra, and Uday Chopra among many others tweeted about the movie and its trailer release.

References

External links 
 
 

2018 films
2018 romantic comedy films
2010s Hindi-language films
Indian romantic comedy films
Indian direct-to-video films
Films scored by Jeet Ganguly
Films directed by Kunal Kohli
2018 direct-to-video films
Films set in London
Films shot in London
Films set in Amritsar